Shy (stylized in all caps) is a Japanese superhero manga series written and illustrated by Bukimi Miki. The series has been serialized in Akita Shoten's shōnen manga magazine Weekly Shōnen Champion since August 2019. As of March 2023, it has been collected into eighteen tankōbon volumes. An anime television series adaptation produced by Eight Bit is set to premiere in 2023.

The story follows Teru Momijiyama as the Japanese hero Shy as she fights alongside the heroes of the earth to ward off evil and keep world peace, all while learning to control her severe shyness and to deal with the fears and uncertainties that come with being a hero. She is accompanied by fellow hero colleagues: Stardust, Century, Lady Black, Meng Long, and her closest friend and mentor, Spirit.

Synopsis

Setting 
As the world was on the brink of a Third World War, superheroes appeared around the globe to restore order and bring about a new era of world peace. After the threat of war ended, each hero returned to a country to help with domestic matters, where they were quickly accepted by their respective citizens. Much of the power and story in Shy deals with people and their "heart", which is either protected by the heroes or manipulated by the villains. Every hero is equipped with a pair of  that allow them to transform their appearance from civilian to hero and communicate with others in any language. When a hero syncs their heart with the bracelets, they become the source of each hero's power and abilities by storing "Heart Power" for use when seen fit. The stronger one's conviction and determination is, the more powerful one can become. If a hero's Heart Power runs out, they return to their civilian form. On the other hand, the villains can manipulate a heart by forcing a person to wear a special type of ring, which are connected back to their leader, as a result of the rings being made from parts of his heart. These rings have the power to draw out the deepest, most extreme feelings in one's heart, which can manifest as black crystals on their body. This kind of heart also has the ability to create a domain of a variable size, like a personal utopia.

Plot 
14-year-old Teru Momijiyama is Japan's hero representative, who goes by the hero name "Shy" as a result of her extreme shyness. After being chosen to serve her country, Teru is invited to make an appearance at an amusement park to give a public speech. However, her shyness ends up boring the audience to the point that she leaves the stage in embarrassment. More misfortune continues as she tries to save riders from a broken roller coaster, with one girl, Iko Koishikawa, suffering severe injuries in the process. The public blames Teru for failing to properly rescue Iko, which causes Teru to slip into a deep depression, lose her powers, and go into isolation for a month. Her closest friend, Russian hero Spirit, appears to her to give her encouragement and try to make her understand that she can't please everyone. With her friend's words in mind, Teru turns her attention to a burning building. She is able to muster up the courage to transform back into Shy and rush into the fire to save a woman and a child. After the series of incidents, Iko is later transferred to Teru's school to make things easier for herself due to her injury, as the school is closer to her home. She thanks her for saving her, and the two get to know each other and become friends.   

Now, with renewed determination, while improving to become a better, more confident person and hero, and fighting alongside her hero colleagues from around the globe, she defends the world against , an evil villainous organization that appeared soon after the world was at peace after the threat of world war ended. The group was created by Stigma, their leader, in order to further his dreams of an ideal world made just for children.

Characters

Heroes 
 / 

Country: Japan
Teru is the main protagonist of the story. She was chosen to be Japan's hero while still attending junior high school. As her hero name implies, she is very shy to a near crippling degree. She is a kind-hearted girl who exudes more of her power when she is helping others. On the other hand, she is also easily held back by her own feelings of helplessness. Despite this, she works tirelessly as her country's representative. As the hero Shy, she wears a white bodysuit with a white eye visor, twin-tailed hood, and gas mask. She usually wears glasses while in civilian form, but not as a hero. She travels with a robotic hero partner, whom she calls  since it looks like a shrimp. She has the ability to turn the Heart Power from her Heart-Shift Bracelets into flames.
 / 
Country: Russia
Pepesha is Teru's best friend and mentor. She is very close with Teru to the point where she can come off as overly protective of her at times. She lost her mother at a very young age, and like her, grew up as an orphan. They were both raised in Yurii Orphanage, a local orphanage. Although she is a heavy drinker who loves drinking Russian vodka, a habit that she picked up from her mother, she is still seen by others as a very dependable person. As the hero Spirit, she wears a black bodysuit under a turtlenecked blue shirt, and has a utility belt at her waist. Her Heart-Shift Bracelets allow her to manipulate gasses and turn her own body into smoke. She can also release a mass of super-compressed air from her palm, a move she dubs the "Fluffy Cannon". She has the ability to fly. Her first name is derived from the World War II-era PPSh-41 submachine gun.
 / 
Country: United Kingdom
In addition to being a rock star and philanthropist, Davie is the founder of Black Cross, an international aid organization. Even though he comes across as charitable, he is known by his hero peers as a heartless and apathetic person who has been known to use drastic and unethical means while going about his heroism. He has an inborn lack of empathy, which he struggled with from an early age, but continued to seek what he lacked and became one of the world's top heroes. He is requested to fight against Shy when the two first met at the Heroes' Hideout, where Shy unlocks her Heart Power during combat. As the hero Stardust, he wears a full black bodysuit with a star in the middle, he has slicked back blonde hair, and he wears a pair of red-framed glasses. With his Heart-Shift Bracelets, he has the ability to control the flow of whatever is around him, which he can use to redirect incoming attacks. He is exceptionally skilled in hand-to-hand combat. He has a accelerated high kick, dubbed the "Ashes to Stardust". His character is modeled after rock star David Bowie.
 / 
Country: Switzerland
Pilse has the power to heal others. Because of this, she is a nursing student and member of Black Cross. She uses artificial legs due to losing both of them in a past accident. Although she tends to have a bit of a sharp tongue and a bad temper, she cares about those that she helps. She is very stern with Teru in order to help spurn her on to being a better hero. As the hero Lady Black, she wears a black dress with a white top, sports black framed-shades, and carries around a red handbag. She normally has short hair as a civilian, but her hair grows longer as a hero, where she wears it in twin tails. She can produce a long black bandage from her Heart-Shift Bracelets. She also possesses incredible stamina due to growing up and training in the mountains. Her last name comes from Red Cross co-founder Henry Dunant.
 / 
Country: China
Li is a slender teenage boy with a feminine appearance. Because of his look, most people confuse him for a girl, as Teru did when she first met him. He is not only bad at fighting, but insecure about not looking as intimidating as other men. He aspires to get stronger, but also wishes he could save those in need without having to fight.  As the hero Meng Long, he wears a white and black traditional Chinese chiffon-style top. His Heart-Shift Bracelets have the ability to brandish claws from his own Heart Power to put his enemies to sleep for a short while. He also finds himself falling asleep at odd times.
 / 
Country: United States
Adam is a hero as well as a military colonel. He has a serious personality and a high sense of pride as a hero. He has a muscular build, is always working out, and is someone who seems to be sensitive about his health. As the hero Century, he wears a white and red bodysuit with horns on his mask. With his Heart-Shift Bracelets, he has the ability to manipulate gravity. Like Spirit, he can fly.
 / 
Country: Germany
Gelm is the director of the medical department of Black Cross. He works alongside Lady Black. He is a mature, experienced man with a gentle and easygoing personality who is the opposite to Plise's steadfast and stern demeanor. As the hero Doktor Schwarz, he  wears a cape with a gas mask tied around his neck over a white shirt, cargo pants, boots, and gloves. He also sports a belt with a pouch on the left side.
 / 
Country: France
L'Arc is nicknamed "The Artist of Space". He is a skilled artist hero who also likes playing pranks on people. He is an up-and-coming artist who has become a hot topic on social media. As the hero La Toile, he wears a white padded jacket and has white hair with a red streak in front. He can be seen carrying art tools. He can change a person or object's appearance using his art.
 / 
Country: India
Ananda is a member of a misfit group of superheroes known as the Shining Six. He knows Teru's sister, the original hero of Japan, Mei Momijiyama, who used the hero name Shine. The Shining Six carry on in Shine's footsteps after her death, as she originally helped to bring the group together. As the hero Nirvana, he wears white pants and a white top with the arms exposed.
 / 
Country: Thailand
Seva is a member of the Shining Six. When Shine was still alive, she loved her as if she were his own sister. As the hero Indra, he fights with a stick art that is covered with electric shocks.
 / 
Country: Spain
Rosalia is a member of the Shining Six. She is Spain's best assassin who is married to fellow Shining Six member Omega Rodriguez.
 / 
Country: Greece
Nyerko is a member of the Shining Six. As the hero Rampage, she has the ability to manipulate and wear metal around her.
 / 
Country: Mexico
Omega is a member of the Shining Six. Formerly a guard for mafia officials, he was at odds with Rosalia's organization, but they later became husband and wife.
 / 
Country: Singapore
Weibu is a member of the Shining Six. He enjoys tinkering with machines. He has a cool personality, but he is not good with girls and gets flustered when they approach him. As the hero Pulse, he uses special tools to assist him in battle, such as drones with guns and electric riot control wires. He also has a special "Fatal Wave" move that allows him to manipulate electric fields to control various electronic devices or to be used as a stun gun when his wires are affixed to a human body.
 / 
Unilord is a celestial emperor who is the leader of the world's heroes. She lives at the Heroes' Hideout and monitors the world's heroes' activities back on Earth. She is not a hero, but she has strong authority and gives orders to the heroes as a supervisor. Although she exudes an air of nobility, she is soft-spoken and sometimes tells jokes.

Amalareiks 

Stigma is the leader of Amalareiks. His true name is unknown, as "Stigma" is what Uni-Lord and other heroes call him, which he later accepts and uses it for himself. He is extremely abstract and childish, even refusing to mature. He wishes to create an adult-free world, one fit only for children. To do this, he formed Amalareiks by gathering deceased children, taking their hearts, turning their wishes and desires into reality, and bestowing a name to all his creations. He uses rings which were made from parts of his heart to manipulate the darkness in other peoples' hearts. He can also attack his opponents using dark power crystals.

Thumping is a boy clad with huge horns, claws, and tail, dressed in a ragged cloak. He is mistaken for a girl when Shy and her squad first meet him, because of his love for cute things, and he explodes in a fit of rage. He can tend to be air-headed and simple-minded. He joined Amalareiks because of his experience of being forced to act the way others wanted him to and having his desired form rejected by the world. He believes that men should be pretty. His abilities are unknown, but his horns and claws grow to enormous sizes when his emotions get the best of him.

Kfufu has a signature laugh, where she gets her name from. She refers to herself in third person and likes to play games and jokes with the heroes. Dressed in a clownish costume, she smiles and laughs because she believes she is at peace as long as she does so. She also believes no matter how a person may be feeling, laughter will lead to peace, and was created and desires to fill the world with laughter because of this. She has the ability to attract things to her and store large and small objects in her costume.

Sveta was created using Spirit's desires. Her goal is to create a world where children can life a happy life. She attacks the heroes while they were searching for a research ship that disappeared in the Arctic, and later clashes with Shy and Spirit at the orphanage in Spirit's hometown. Her true identity is that of Pepesha's deceased mother, Lenya Andreanof, who died 15 years ago and left Pepesha to an orphanage. Her youthful appearance makes her resemble Spirit as an infant. She has the power to manipulate ice.
 / 
Hollow is a former shinobi who ran away from her home village of Sōga to join Amalreiks. She younger sister of Ai Tennoji, a fellow shinobi. She does not like to fight and prefers to live a peaceful life, which led to her abandoning her shinobi training, killing numerous pursuers that have been trying to return her to her village. Soon after, her attitude changed and she pierced the heart of her sister with a sword radiating evil power, named "Void". She has the ability to erase minds.
 / 
Kirakira is an Amalareiks member with a tsundere personality. She instantly falls in love with Teru when the two first meet, wanting to marry her. She then invites Teru to her house, where she tries to convert Teru's heart by revealing one of Stigma's rings to force Teru to put it on as an "engagement ring", so that she will be "hers forever".

Prayer is a woman with the ability to awaken people to love. She is a nun with a halo and three pairs of wings. She believes that love is the strongest power above all else, and that by giving love to others, the circle of love will expand and cover the world. A halo appears above the head of a person who is under the influence of her ability.

Others 

Iko is a 14-year-old girl who was saved by Shy from a broken roller coaster, although she ended up injuring her leg in the process, which Shy was blamed for. Shortly thereafter, she was saved again by Shy after having her heart manipulated by Stigma, forcing her to wear one of his rings. As she grows closer to Teru, she ends up transferring to her school, as it is closer to her home. She has a younger brother, who was also saved by Shy. She is the first person in the story to have had Stigma's ring placed on her and corrupt her heart.

Lenya is Pepesha's mother. She was born and raised in Yurii Orphanage. She raised Pepesha as a single mother in extreme poverty, but was murdered by thugs and her body was drowned in the river. She sent a letter of advice before her death, and Pepesha was taken in by the same orphanage as her. Pepesha's fondness for alcohol was due to the fact that in her poverty, Lenya was only happy and laughed like a child when she drank.

Ai is a shinobi and princess of Sōga Village. Unhappy with being sheltered in her home dwelling, she ran away in search of freedom and a longing to see the outside world. She is Mai's older sister, who was stabbed in the heart by her sister's sword. The wound did not kill her, yet it left her deeply injured and caused damage to her motor functions. Like her sister, she carries a sword, named "Purity", which has the power to know the feelings of those who touch it.

Tokimaru is another shinobi from Sōga Village who is tasked with protecting Ai. He identifies himself as having come from a neighboring village to serve the Tennoji family, and is welcomed into Sōga as a disciple of Ai. Since then he has been friends with Ai and Mai since the three were children, as they all endured the same shinobi training together. At first, he tries to force Ai to return to her village, but later decides to let her do as she wishes, all while still watching over her from afar.

Production 
In 2016, rookie author Bukimi Miki wrote and illustrated a 43-page one-shot story entitled "SHY", which won the Newcomer's Grand Prize in Akita Shoten's Next Champion, a contest for up-and-coming manga authors, in the latter half of that year. The one-shot was then published in issue #7 of Weekly Shōnen Champion on January 12, 2017, roughly 2 years before the story received full serialization.

Media

Manga 
Shy is written and illustrated by Bukimi Miki. The series has been serialized in Akita Shoten's shōnen manga magazine Weekly Shōnen Champion since August 1, 2019, in issue #35. Akita Shoten has collected its chapters into individual tankōbon volumes. The first volume was released on December 6, 2019. As of March 8, 2023, eighteen volumes have been released.

The manga has been licensed to many countries in Europe starting in 2020: in France by Kana in September 2020, in Germany by Kazé in October 2020, in Spain by Panini Comics in April 2021, and in Italy by Planet Manga in August 2021. In July 2022, at Anime Expo, Yen Press announced that they licensed the series for English publication in North America.

Volume list 

|}

Chapters not yet in tankōbon format

Anime 
On October 6, 2022, an anime television series adaptation by Eight Bit was announced. The series will be directed by Masaomi Andō. It is set to premiere in 2023.

Reception 
Writing for OTAQUEST, Jacob Parker-Dalton compared Shy to a similar manga, Kohei Horikoshi's My Hero Academia, which runs in Shueisha's weekly shōnen publication, Weekly Shōnen Jump. While noting that both manga share similarities on a basic level, such as both protagonists being young rookie superheroes and a planet inhabited by individuals with superpowers, he delved into more of the differences between the two stories. He noted how Shy doesn't have as many heroes compared to My Hero Academia, and also wrote about how darker and more mysterious the main villain is, saying how Stigma "is decidedly darker as they prey upon the darkest parts of the human heart, converting victims into the kind of corrupted monsters that you’d see on a Saturday morning episode of Sailor Moon." And also how he "is decisively more sinister as their identity and motives remain shrouded in mystery." Finally, noting the more serious drama in the story, he writes, "[Shy's] own ineptitude as a hero, caused to some extent by her bashful disposition, might now lead to a tangible loss of human life. The majority of the series’ first volume and major arc deals with this very real human drama, the likes of which probably never would be published in Weekly Shōnen Jump."

Steven Blackburn of Screen Rant praised Shy, calling it an "underrated" manga, also complimenting how the story "expertly delves into the insecurities of both the hero and civilian in original ways that other publishers including DC and Marvel have yet to accomplish."

In 2020, the manga was nominated for the 6th Next Manga Awards in the print manga category.

Notes

References

External links 
 Shy at Akita Shoten's official website 
 Shy official anime website 
 

2019 manga
Action anime and manga
Akita Shoten manga
Anime series based on manga
Eight Bit (studio)
Science fiction anime and manga
Shōnen manga
Superheroes in anime and manga
Upcoming anime television series
Yen Press titles